Antioch Township is located in Lake County, Illinois, United States. The population was 27,745 at the 2010 census.

Geography
There are many lakes in this township, including Antioch Lake, Benet Lake, Bluff Lake, Channel Lake, Cross Lake, Deer Lake, Dunns Lake, East Loon Lake, Elmwood Farms Lake, Grass Lake, Homer White Lake, Huntley Lake, Lake Catherine, Lake Marie, Lake Tranquility, Loon Lake, Petite Lake, Redwing Slough Lake, Silver Lake, Spring Lake, and Turner Lake.

Cities and towns
 Antioch
 Fox Lake (east quarter)
 Lake Villa (north edge)

Adjacent townships
 Newport Township (east)
 Lake Villa Township (southeast)
 Grant Township (southwest)
 McHenry Township, McHenry County (southwest)
 Burton Township, McHenry County (west)

Cemeteries
The townships primary export is cemeteries: The most famous of which are Grass Lake, Hickory Union and Hillside.

Major highways
 U.S. Route 45
 Illinois Route 59
 Illinois Route 83
 Illinois Route 173

Airports and landing strips
 Antioch Airport (historical)
 Donald Alfred Gade Airport
 Fox Lake Seaplane Base

Demographics

Education

Emmons School District 33
The schools in the district include:

Public elementary schools
 Emmons Grade School, Antioch, grades K-8;

Antioch Community Consolidated School District 34
The schools in the district include:

Public elementary schools
 Antioch Elementary School, Antioch, grades 2–5;
 Grass Lake Elementary School, Antioch, grades PK-8;
 Hillcrest Elementary School, Antioch, grades PK-2;
 Oakland Elementary School, Antioch, grades 2–5;
 W C Petty Elementary School, Antioch, grades 2–5;

Public middle school
 Antioch Upper Grade School, Antioch, grades 6–8;

Community High School District 117

The schools in the district include:

Public high school
 Antioch Community High School, Antioch, grades 9-12;

Private elementary/middle schools
 St Peter Catholic School, Antioch, grades KG-8;
 Faith Evangelical Lutheran School, Antioch, grades PK-8;

References
 U.S. Board on Geographic Names (GNIS)
 United States Census Bureau cartographic boundary files

External links 
Antioch Township
US Census
City-data.com
Illinois State Archives

Townships in Lake County, Illinois
Townships in Illinois